Ḍ (minuscule: ḍ) is a letter of the Latin alphabet, formed from D with the addition of a dot diacritic.

In the transcription of Afro-Asiatic languages such as Arabic, ⟨ḍ⟩ represents an "emphatic" consonant , and is used for that purpose in the Berber Latin alphabet.

In the transcription of Indic and East Iranian languages, and in the orthography of the O'odham and Sicilian languages, ⟨ḍ⟩ represents a retroflex . This was used in a former transcription of Javanese, but has been replaced by ⟨dh⟩.

Encoding

See also
 Ḍād

Latin letters with diacritics
Phonetic transcription symbols